The Holocaust in Estonia refers to the Nazi crimes during the 1941-1944 occupation of Estonia by Nazi Germany. 

Prior to the war, there were approximately 4,300 Estonian Jews. During the 1940-1941 Soviet occupation of Estonia, about 10% of the Jewish population was deported to Siberia, along with other Estonians. Following the Axis invasion in 1941, approximately 75% of Estonian Jews, aware of the fate that awaited them from Nazi Germany, fled eastward into Russia and other parts of the Soviet Union. Virtually all of those Jews who remained (between 950 and 1,000 people) were murdered by German units such as Einsatzgruppe A and/or local collaborators before the end of 1941. The Romani people in Estonia were also murdered and enslaved by the Nazi German occupiers and their collaborators. 

The Nazi German occupation authorities also killed around 6,000 ethnic Estonians and 1,000 ethnic Russians in Estonia, either on the basis that they were communists or communist sympathizers. In addition around 15,000 Soviet prisoners-of-war and Jews from other parts of Europe were killed in Estonia during the German occupation.

Jewish life pre-Holocaust

Prior to World War II, Jewish life flourished in Estonia with the level of cultural autonomy accorded being the most extensive in all of Europe, giving full control of education and other aspects of cultural life to the local Jewish population. In 1936, the British-based Jewish newspaper The Jewish Chronicle reported that "Estonia is the only country in Eastern Europe where neither the Government nor the people practice any discrimination against Jews and where Jews are left in peace and are allowed to lead a free and unmolested life and fashion it in accord with their national and cultural principles."

Murder of Jewish population
Round-ups and murders of the remaining Jews began immediately as the first stage of Generalplan Ost which would require the "removal" of 50% of Estonians.  Undertaken by the extermination squad Einsatzkommando (Sonderkommando) 1A under Martin Sandberger, part of Einsatzgruppe A led by Walter Stahlecker, who followed the arrival of the first German troops on July 7, 1941. Arrests and executions continued as the Germans, with the assistance of local collaborators, advanced through Estonia. Estonia became a part of the Reichskommissariat Ostland. A Sicherheitspolizei (Security Police) was established for internal security under the leadership of Ain-Ervin Mere in 1942. Estonia was declared Judenfrei quite early by the German occupation regime at the Wannsee Conference. 
The Jews who had remained in Estonia (929 according to the most recent calculation) were murdered. Fewer than a dozen Estonian Jews are known to have survived the war in Estonia.

German policy toward the Jews in Estonia 
The Estonian state archives contain death certificates and lists of Jews shot dated July, August, and early September 1941. For example, the official death certificate of Rubin Teitelbaum, born in Tapa on January 17, 1907, states laconically in a form with item 7 already printed with only the date left blank: "7. By a decision of the Sicherheitspolizei on September 4, 1941, condemned to death, with the decision being carried out the same day in Tallinn." Teitelbaum's crime was "being a Jew" and thus constituting a "threat to the public order".

On September 11, 1941 an article entitled "Juuditäht seljal" – "A Jewish Star on the Back" appeared in the Estonian mass-circulation newspaper Postimees. It stated that Dr. Otto-Heinrich Drechsler, the High Commissioner of Ostland, had proclaimed ordinances in accordance with which all Jewish residents of Ostland from that day onward had to wear visible yellow six-pointed Star of David at least . in diameter on the left side of their chest and back.

On the same day regulations issued by the Sicherheitspolizei were delivered to all local police departments proclaiming that the Nuremberg Laws were in force in Ostland, defining who is a Jew, and what Jews could and could not do. Jews were prohibited from changing their place of residence, walking along the sidewalk, using any means of transportation, going to theatres, museums, cinema, or school. The professions of lawyer, physician, notary, banker, or real estate agent were declared closed to Jews, as was the occupation of street hawker. The regulations also declared that the property and homes of Jewish residents were to be confiscated. The regulations emphasized that work to this ends was to be begun as soon as possible, and that lists of Jews, their addresses, and their property were to be completed by the police by September 20, 1941.

These regulations also provided for the establishment of a concentration camp near the south-eastern Estonian city of Tartu. A later decision provided for the construction of a Jewish ghetto near the town of Harku, but this was never built, a small concentration camp being built there instead. The Estonian State Archives contain material pertinent to the cases of about 450 Estonian Jews. They were typically arrested either at home or in the street, taken to the local police station, and charged with the 'crime' of being Jews. They were either shot outright or sent to concentration camp and shot later. An Estonian woman, E. S. describes the arrest of her Jewish husband as follows:

Foreign Jews
After the German invasion of Lithuania, Latvia and Estonia, it was the intention of the Nazi government to use the three Baltic countries as one of their main areas of mass genocide. Consequently, Jews from countries outside the Baltics were deported there to be killed. An estimated 10,000 Jews were killed in Estonia after having been deported to camps there from elsewhere in eastern Europe. The Nazi regime also established 22 concentration camps in occupied Estonian territory for foreign Jews, where they would be used as slave laborers. The largest, Vaivara concentration camp, served as a transit camp and processed 20,000 Jews from Latvia and the Lithuanian ghettos. Usually able-bodied men were selected to work in the oil shale mines in northeastern Estonia. Women, children, and old people were killed on arrival.

At least two trainloads of Central European Jews were deported to Estonia and were killed on arrival at the Kalevi-Liiva site near Jägala concentration camp.

Murder of foreign Jews at Kalevi-Liiva 

According to testimony of the survivors, at least two transports with about 2,100–2,150 Central European Jews, arrived at the railway station at Raasiku, one from Theresienstadt (Terezin) with Czechoslovakian Jews and one from Berlin with German citizens. Around 1,700–1,750 people were immediately taken to an execution site at the Kalevi-Liiva sand dunes and shot. About 450 people were selected for work at the Jägala concentration camp.

Transport Be 1.9.1942 from Theresienstadt arrived at the Raasiku station on September 5, 1942, after a five-day trip. According to testimony given to Soviet authorities by Ralf Gerrets, one of the accused at the 1961 war crimes trials in USSR, eight busloads of Estonian auxiliary police had arrived from Tallinn. The selection process was supervised by Ain-Ervin Mere, chief of Security Police in Estonia; those transportees not selected for slave labor were sent by bus to a killing site near the camp. Later the police, in teams of 6 to 8 men, killed the Jews by machine gun fire. During later investigations, however, some guards of camp denied the participation of police and said that executions were done by camp personnel. On the first day, a total of 900 people were murdered in this way. Gerrets testifies that he had fired a pistol at a victim who was still making noises in the pile of bodies. The whole operation was directed by SS commanders Heinrich Bergmann and Julius Geese. Few witnesses pointed out Heinrich Bergmann as the key figure behind the extermination of Estonian gypsies. In the case of Be 1.9.1942, the only ones chosen for labor and to survive the war were a small group of young women who were taken through a series of concentration camps in Estonia, Poland and Germany to Bergen-Belsen, where they were liberated. Camp commandant Laak used the women as sex slaves, killing many after they had outlived their usefulness.

A number of foreign witnesses were heard at the post-war trials in Soviet-occupied Estonia, including five women who had been transported on Be 1.9.1942 from Theresienstadt.
According to witness testimony, the accused Mere, Gerrets and Viik actively participated in mass killings and other crimes that were perpetrated by the Nazi invaders in Estonia. In accordance with the Nazi racial theory, the Sicherheitspolizei and Sicherheitsdienst were instructed to exterminate the Jews and Gypsies. To that end, during August and September of 1941, Mere and his collaborators set up a death camp at Jägala,  from Tallinn. Mere put Aleksander Laak in charge of the camp; Ralf Gerrets was appointed his deputy. On 5 September 1942, a train with approximately 1,500 Czechoslovak citizens arrived at the Raasiku railway station. Mere, Laak and Gerrets personally selected who of them should be executed and who should be moved to the Jägala death camp. More than 1,000 people, mostly children, the old, and the infirm, were transported to a wasteland at Kalevi-Liiva, where they were executed in a special pit. In mid-September, the second troop train with 1,500 prisoners arrived at the railway station from Germany. Mere, Laak, and Gerrets selected another thousand victims, who were then condemned by them to extermination. This group of prisoners, which included nursing women and their newborn babies, were transported to Kalevi-Liiva where they were killed.
In March 1943, the personnel of the Kalevi-Liiva camp executed about fifty Romani people, half of whom were under 5 years of age. Also were executed 60 Roma children of school age...

Romani people
A few witnesses pointed out Heinrich Bergmann as the key figure behind the extermination of Estonian Roma people.

Estonian collaboration 

Units of the Eesti Omakaitse (Estonian Home Guard; approximately 1000 to 1200 men) were directly involved in criminal acts, taking part in the round-up of 200 Roma people and 950 Jews. 

The final acts of liquidating the camps, such as Klooga, which involved the mass-shooting of roughly 2,000 prisoners, was facilitated by members of the 287th Police Battalion. Survivors report that, during these last days before liberation, when Jewish slave labourers were visible, the Estonian population in part attempted to help the Jews by providing food and other types of assistance."War crimes trials
Four Estonians deemed most responsible for the murders at Kalevi-Liiva were accused at the war crimes trials in 1961. Two were later executed, while the Soviet occupation authorities were unable to press charges against the other two due to the fact that they lived in exile. There have been 7 known ethnic Estonians (Ralf Gerrets, Ain-Ervin Mere, Jaan Viik, Juhan Jüriste, Karl Linnas, Aleksander Laak and Ervin Viks) who have faced trials for crimes against humanity committed during the Nazi occupation in Estonia. The accused were charged with murdering up to 5,000 German and Czechoslovakian Jews and Romani people near the Kalevi-Liiva concentration camp in 1942–1943. Ain-Ervin Mere, commander of the Estonian Security Police (Group B of the Sicherheitspolizei) under the Estonian Self-Administration, was tried in absentia. Before the trial, Mere had been an active member of the Estonian community in England, contributing to Estonian language publications. At the time of the trial, however, he was being held in custody in England, having been accused of murder. He was never deported and died a free man in England in 1969. Ralf Gerrets, the deputy commandant at the Jägala camp. Jaan Viik, (Jan Wijk,  Ian Viik), a guard at the Jägala labor camp, out of the hundreds of Estonian camp guards and police, was singled out for prosecution due to his particular brutality. Witnesses testified that he would throw small children into the air and shoot them. He did not deny the charge. A fourth accused, camp commandant Aleksander Laak (Alexander Laak), was discovered living in Canada, but committed suicide before he could be brought to trial.

In January 1962, another trial was held in Tartu. Juhan Jüriste, Karl Linnas and Ervin Viks were accused of murdering 12,000 civilians in the Tartu concentration camp.

 Number of victims 
Soviet-Estonian era sources estimate the total number of Soviet citizens and foreigners to be murdered in Nazi-occupied Estonian Soviet Socialist Republic to be 125,000. The bulk of this number consists Jews from Central and Western Europe and Soviet prisoners-of-war killed or starved to death in prisoner-of-war camps on Estonian territory.
The Estonian History Commission estimates the total number of victims to be roughly 35,000, consisting of the following groups:
 1000 Estonian Jews,
 about 10,000 foreign Jews,
 1000 Estonian Roma,
 7000 ethnic Estonians,
 15,000 Soviet POWs.

The number of Estonian Jews killed is less than 1,000; the German Holocaust perpetrators Martin Sandberger and Walter Stahlecker cite the numbers 921 and 963 respectively. In 1994 Evgenia Goorin-Loov calculated the exact number to be 929.

Modern memorials

Since the reestablishment of the Estonian independence, markers were put in place for the 60th anniversary of the mass executions that were carried out at the Lagedi, Vaivara and Klooga (Kalevi-Liiva) camps in September 1944. On February 5, 1945 in Berlin, Ain Mere founded the Eesti Vabadusliit together with SS-Obersturmbannführer Harald Riipalu. He was sentenced to the capital punishment during the Holocaust trials in Soviet Estonia but was not extradited by Great Britain and died there in peace. In 2002 the Government of the Republic of Estonia decided to officially commemorate the Holocaust. In the same year, the Simon Wiesenthal Center had provided the Estonian government with information on alleged Estonian war criminals, all former members of the 36th Estonian Police Battalion.
In August 2018 it was reported that the memorial at Kalevi-Liiva was defaced.

 Concentration camps 

 KZ-Stammlager 
 KZ Vaivara
 Klooga

 KZ-Außenlager 
KZ Aseri
KZ Auvere
KZ Erides
KZ Goldfields (Kohtla)
KZ Ilinurme
KZ Jewe
KZ Kerestowo (Karstala in Viru Ingria, now in Gatchinsky District)
KZ Kiviöli
KZ Kukruse
KZ Kunda
KZ Kuremaa
KZ Lagedi
KZ Klooga, Lodensee. Commandant SS-Untersturmführer Wilhelm Werle. (b. 1907, d. 1966),; September 1943 – September 1944. There were held 2 000 – 3 000 prisoners, most of them the Lithuanian Jews. When the Red Army approached, SS-men shot the 2 500 prisoners on September 19, 1944 and burned most of the bodies. The fewer than 100 prisoners succeeded in surviving by hiding. There is a monument on the location of the concentration camp.
KZ Narwa
KZ Pankjavitsa, Pankjewitza. It was situated app. 15 km south of the village of Pankjavitsa near the hamlet of Roodva in the former Estonian province of Petserimaa. Since 1945 Russia occupies a large part of this province including Roodva/Rootova.  The camp was established in November 1943. On 11 November that year 250 prisoners from Klooga arrived. Their accommodations were barracks. Already in January 1944 the camp was shut down and the inmates were relocated to Kūdupe (in Latvia near the Estonian border), Petseri and Ülenurme. Likely the camp was closed after some kind of work was finished. It was affiliated to the Vaivara camp.
KZ Narwa-Hungerburg
KZ Putki (in Piiri Parish, near Slantsy)
KZ Reval (Ülemiste?)
KZ Saka
KZ Sonda
KZ Soski (in Vasknarva Parish)
KZ Wiwikond
KZ Ülenurme

 Arbeits- und Erziehungslager 
AEL Jägala (August 1942 – September 1943)
AEL Murru
AEL Reval
Harku (243 Estonian Romani people were executed in the Harku concentration camp on 27 October 1942)
Lasnamäe
AEL Tartu (commandant Karl Linnas)
AEL Turba (in Ellamaa)

 Prisons 
Haapsalu
Kuressaare
Narva (in Vestervalli street, 1941–1944)
Petseri
Pärnu
Tartu
Valga
Võru

 Other concentration camps 
Dvigatel (in Tallinn)
Essu
Järvakandi
Laitse
Lavassaare
Lehtse
Lelle (1942 – May 1943)
Roela
Sitsi (in Tallinn, at the end of Tööstuse street where was 10 barracks; until 17 September 1944)
Vasalemma

See also
The Holocaust in Lithuania
The Holocaust in Latvia

 References 

 Bibliography 
 12000: Tartus 16.-20.jaanuaril 1962 massimõrvarite Juhan Jüriste, Karl Linnase ja Ervin Viksi üle peetud kohtuprotsessi materjale. Karl Lemmik and Ervin Martinson. Eesti Riiklik Kirjastus. 1962
 Ants Saar, Vaikne suvi vaikses linnas. Eesti Raamat. 1971
 "Eesti vaimuhaigete saatus Saksa okupatsiooni aastail (1941–1944)", Eesti Arst, nr. March 3, 2007
 Ervin Martinson. Elukutse – reetmine. Eesti Raamat. 1970
 Ervin Martinson. Haakristi teenrid. Eesti Riiklik Kirjastus. 1962
 Inimesed olge valvsad. Vladimir Raudsepp. Eesti Riiklik Kirjastus. 1961
 Pruun katk: Dokumentide kogumik fašistide kuritegude kohta okupeeritud Eesti NSV territooriumil. Ervin Martinson and A. Matsulevitš. Eesti Raamat. 1969
 SS tegutseb: Dokumentide kogumik SS-kuritegude kohta. Eesti Riiklik Kirjastus. 1963

Further reading

 External links 
Birn, Ruth Bettina (2001), Collaboration with Nazi Germany in Eastern Europe: the Case of the Estonian Security Police. Contemporary European History'' 10.2, 181–198.
Extermination of the Gypsies in Estonia during World War II
Operation 1005 in Riga by Jens Hoffmann

 
Military history of Estonia during World War II
World War II prisoner of war massacres
Eastern Front (World War II)
Estonia
Nazi war crimes in the Soviet Union
Generalbezirk Estland